Tandi is a city in the Ratnanagar Municipality of the Chitwan District in Nepal. It lies on the eastern side of Chitwan district, and is at the entrance point of Sauraha Chitwan National Park, a Major Tourist destination in Nepal.It is the second largest and oldest Urban Area of the district..This Beautiful Town has got the Space for All Major Banks and isurance Co.Of Nepal.This is the fastes Growing Town in Chitwan.It has got a very well Equipped National level Hospital which serves the people around Eastern part of Chitwan and makwanpur District.Almost 95% of the municipal area has got well managed paved roads.Tandi being the heart of the Ratnanagar,it is famous for Entry point to Sauraha and also renowned for Especial Tharu cuisine like ghunghi,Haas ko chhoila etc.this town has got all the basic to advanced facility of a (A-) class Town.

Background
Tandi, the main city in the Ratnanagar municipality of Chitwan district, is home to Chitwan National Park, formerly known as Royal Chitwan National Park, a UNESCO World Heritage Site and a world-renowned tourist destination. Tourism is a major industry of the city and a source of daily living especially for thousands of ethnic minorities called Tharus, who predominantly lived there before waves of migration from nearby hilly regions (mainly Dhading, Tanahu, Lamjung, Baglung, Parbat) came to settle in the place once considered unfriendly for living due to deadly aulo (a disease caused by the bite of a deadly form of mosquito).

The major tourist attractions include the national park where visitors can go on an elephant safari – riding on the elephant's back through the jungle to view the wild animals including indian rhinoceros. Bis Hajaar Taal (meaning "Twenty Thousand Lakes") is an area where visitors can witness thousands of varieties of birds, some of which are rare and nearly extinct. 

Like any other cities in Chitwan, Tandi is inhabited by a very diverse community of people who migrated to this place from different parts of Nepal. It is often said that Chitwan is a 76th district, as this place is traditionally inhabited by people representing all other 75 districts of Nepal. Lying along the East-West Highway at the central part of the country, this place offers an exciting opportunity for people wanting to do business. Poultry and cotton industries, besides the tourism industry, are major industries of the region.

Just about 5 km southeast of Tandi after crossing the 'Kayer River' and its tributaries, past Seri village and its open fields and finally the 'Padariya River', there is a historical village called 'Jhuwani'. It was the old headquarters of Chitwan district. Historically, while the Ranas were in power in Nepal, the distribution of population was very thin throughout Nepal and Chitwan. In Chitwan, there were many Tharu communities and in Jhuwani village as well. These indigenous people were considered to be resistant to malaria. Most of Chitwan was covered with dense jungle, mosquitoes and malaria was very prevalent.(Malaria is 'aulo' in Nepal language). Now, Jhuwani village has a secondary school, a resource centre, a newly built community library with thousands of books, newspapers, magazines, computers and internet facilities, many tea shops and general shops (called Kirana shops) and a dairy (milk collection) centre where most of villagers in the morning meet and greet each other. While they are having tea and chatting with their mates about their day-to-day business, the whole atmosphere and feel so good and a pleasure, particularly if you are connected to those people or know them from childhood. In addition, Jhuwani has a youth club called 'Lali Gurash'( Red Rhododendron) and many sport teams from cricket to football are active. There is a large football ground near the bank of the 'Dhumre River'. Next to the football pitch, there is a local community forest where you can spend your extra time with your friends/family.

2 km southwest of Jhuwani lies Sauraha- a tourist destination, developed in the 1980s. About 50 different hotels with the usual facilities are available there. In addition, forest walking, village walking, bicycle riding, elephant riding, bird watching, boating on the Rapati river, forex centre, book shops and cafes have sprung up. The most important thing about the place is it is not crowded and the people are really nice and they greet you with a 'special smile'. People around the village are very simple and welcoming, in addition to this, the younger generation are fluent in English. As always as in small communities, most people know each other. There is a direct road which is motorable from Tandi to Jhuwani and Saurha. The life and economy of these places are interconnected.

Tandi, is also the economic center of the Ratnanagar Municipality and the Village District Committees (VDCs) around the municipality.

Populated places in Chitwan District